Club Deportivo Soledad was a Spanish football team based in Palma, Majorca, in the autonomous community of Balearic Islands. Founded in 1929, it played its last season (2009–10) in Regional Preferente, holding home games at Estadio Son Malferit, with a capacity of 3,500 seats.

History
In 2005, Soledad was merged with CD Paguera, which had just promoted to Tercera División. On July, 2010, CD Soledad was forced to dissolved due to not be able to pay fully debts with its players.

Club background
CD Soledad - (1929–2005)
CD Soledad-Paguera - (2005–06)
CD Soledad - (2006–2010)

Season to season

19 seasons in Tercera División

References

Sport in Palma de Mallorca
Association football clubs established in 1929
Association football clubs disestablished in 2010
Defunct football clubs in the Balearic Islands
1929 establishments in Spain
2010 disestablishments in Spain